Dixon Springs is an unincorporated community in Pope County, Illinois, United States.

History
Dixon Springs was named after William Dixon, the first settler, in 1848. In the early 1900s it became a favorite summer resort.

References

Unincorporated communities in Pope County, Illinois
Unincorporated communities in Illinois